Fatma Al-Nabhani (born 20 May 1991) is an inactive Omani tennis player.

She has won ten singles titles and fourteen doubles titles on the ITF Women's Circuit. On 4 October 2010, she reached her best singles ranking of world No. 362. On 28 April 2014, she peaked at No. 238 in the doubles rankings.

Al-Nabhani made her WTA Tour main-draw debut at the 2009 Dubai Tennis Championships, having received a wildcard with Magali de Lattre in the doubles tournament, but they lost to Chan Yung-jan and Sun Tiantian in the first round.

Playing for Oman in Fed Cup competitions, Al Nabhani has a win–loss record of 13–7.

Al-Nabhani is the younger sister of Mohammed Al-Nabhani, who is also a tennis player.

ITF Circuit finals

Singles: 18 (10 titles, 8 runner-ups)

Doubles: 41 (14 titles, 28 runner-ups)

See also
 Muslim women in sport

References

External links
 
 
 

1991 births
Living people
People from Muscat, Oman
Omani female tennis players
Tennis players at the 2010 Asian Games
Tennis players at the 2014 Asian Games
Tennis players at the 2018 Asian Games
Asian Games competitors for Oman